ABG Sundal Collier Holding ASA is a Nordic investment bank offering investment banking, stock broking and corporate advisory services to institutional investors and high net-worth individuals (HNWI).
Its shares are publicly quoted and listed on the Oslo Stock Exchange. ABGSC provides distribution of Nordic securities to local and international investors. 
Founded in 1984, the company is headquartered in Oslo, Norway. 
The group currently has approximately 250 partners and employees working from offices in Oslo, Stockholm, Copenhagen, London, New York City and Frankfurt.

References

External links

Official site

Financial services companies of Norway
Companies based in Oslo
Companies listed on the Oslo Stock Exchange
Companies listed on Nasdaq Stockholm
Norwegian companies established in 2001